Dishwasher salmon is an American fish dish made with the heat from a dishwasher, particularly from its drying phase.

Preparation
Pieces of salmon are spiced and wrapped tightly in at least two layers of aluminum foil and put in a dishwasher. The dishwasher is set to perform the wash and dry cycle. Depending on the model of the dishwasher, the salmon is broiled, steamed and baked. An advantage of the method is that the prepared dish does not smell. There is nothing preventing one from washing the dishes at the same time, provided that the package is tight enough.

History
Originating in the United States, Vincent Price demonstrated preparation of fish in 1975 when appearing at The Tonight Show with Johnny Carson. Price presented the dish as "a dish any fool can prepare".

Preparation of the dish has been presented in the Canadian show The Surreal Gourmet hosted by Bob Blumer in 2002. Reports about the dish have been published by The Wall Street Journal, NBC, BBC, Vogue CHOICE  and CBS News which interviewed Kym Douglas about the book The Black Book of Hollywood Diet Secrets where the dish is presented.

References

External links
 Dishwasher salmon with a piquant dill sauce recipe
 Kym Douglas presents the dish on a morning show on CBS News in March 2008 (near the end of the video)

Salmon dishes
American seafood dishes
Dishwashing